Kamaru may be,

Language
Kamaru language, Indonesia
Kamurú language, Brazil

People
Joseph Kamaru
Kamaru Usman
Norman Kamaru